The Malpighiales comprise one of the largest orders of flowering plants, containing about 36 families and more than  species, about 7.8% of the eudicots. The order is very diverse, containing plants as different as the willow, violet, poinsettia, manchineel, rafflesia and coca plant, and are hard to recognize except with molecular phylogenetic evidence. It is not part of any of the classification systems based only on plant morphology. Molecular clock calculations estimate the origin of stem group Malpighiales at around 100 million years ago (Mya) and the origin of crown group Malpighiales at about 90 Mya.

The Malpighiales are divided into 32 to 42 families, depending upon which clades in the order are given the taxonomic rank of family. In the APG III system, 35 families were recognized. Medusagynaceae, Quiinaceae, Peraceae, Malesherbiaceae, Turneraceae, Samydaceae, and Scyphostegiaceae were consolidated into other families. The largest family, by far, is the Euphorbiaceae, with about 6300 species in about 245 genera.

In a 2009 study of DNA sequences of 13 genes, 42 families were placed into 16 groups, ranging in size from one to 10 families. The relationships among these 16 groups remain poorly resolved. Malpighiales and Lamiales are the two large orders whose phylogeny remains mostly unresolved.

Some examples of notable species include cassava, a tuber that is a major staple food crop in much of the world; the stinking corpse lily, which produces that largest known flower of any plant; the willows; flaxseed, an important food and fiber crop; Saint John's wort, a herb with a long history of medicinal uses; castor bean, the source of the infamous poison ricin; passionfruit, which produces an edible fruit and psychoactive flowers with a history of traditional medicinal uses; poinsettia, a common ornamental plant; the mangosteen; manchineel tree, one of the most toxic trees in the world; poplars, aspens, and cottonwoods which are commonly used for timber—and many more.

Affinities 
Malpighiales is a member of a supraordinal group called the COM clade, which consists of the orders Celastrales, Oxalidales, and Malpighiales. Some describe it as containing a fourth order, Huales, separating the family Huaceae into its own order, separate from Oxalidales.

Some recent studies have placed Malpighiales as sister to Oxalidales sensu lato (including Huaceae), while others have found a different topology for the COM clade.

The COM clade is part of an unranked group known as malvids (rosid II), though formally placed in Fabidae (rosid I). These in turn  are part of a group that has long been recognized, namely, the rosids.

History 

The French botanist Charles Plumier named the genus Malpighia in honor of Marcello Malpighi's work on plants; Malpighia is the type genus for the Malpighiaceae, a family of tropical and subtropical flowering plants.

The family Malpighiaceae was the type family for one of the orders created by Jussieu in his 1789 work Genera Plantarum. Friedrich von Berchtold and Jan Presl described such an order in 1820. Unlike modern taxonomists, these authors did not use the suffix "ales" in naming their orders. The name "Malpighiales" is attributed by some to Carl von Martius. In the 20th century, it was usually associated with John Hutchinson, who used it in all three editions of his book, The Families of Flowering Plants. The name was not used by those who wrote later, in the 1970s, '80s, and '90s.

The taxon was largely presaged by Hans Hallier in 1912 in an article in the Archiv. Néerl. Sci. Exact. Nat. titled "L'Origine et le système phylétique des angiospermes", in which his Passionales and Polygalinae were derived from Linaceae (in Guttales), with Passionales containing seven (of eight) families that also appear in the current Malpighiales, namely Passifloraceae, Salicaceae, Euphorbiaceae, Achariaceae, Flacourtiaceae, Malesherbiaceae, and Turneraceae, and  Polygalinae containing four (of 10) families that also appear in the current Malpighiales, namely Malpighiaceae, Violaceae, Dichapetalaceae, and Trigoniaceae.

The molecular phylogenetic revolution led to a major restructuring of the order. The first semblance of Malpighiales as now known came from a phylogeny of seed plants published in 1993 and based upon DNA sequences of the gene rbcL. This study recovered a group of rosids unlike any group found in any previous system of plant classification. To make a clear break with classification systems being used at that time, the Angiosperm Phylogeny Group resurrected Hutchinson's name,  though his concept of Malpighiales included much of what is now in Celastrales and Oxalidales.

Circumscription 

Malpighiales is monophyletic and in molecular phylogenetic studies, it receives strong statistical support. Since the APG II system was published in 2003, minor changes to the circumscription of the order have been made. The family Peridiscaceae has been expanded from two genera to three, and then to four, and transferred to Saxifragales.

The genera Cyrillopsis (Ixonanthaceae), Centroplacus (Centroplacaceae), Bhesa (Centroplacaceae), Aneulophus (Erythroxylaceae), Ploiarium (Bonnetiaceae), Trichostephanus (Samydaceae), Sapria (Rafflesiaceae), Rhizanthes (Rafflesiaceae), and Rafflesia (Rafflesiaceae) had been either added or confirmed as members of Malpighiales by the end of 2009.

Some family delimitations have changed, as well, most notably, the segregation of Calophyllaceae from Clusiaceae sensu lato when it was shown that the latter is paraphyletic. Some differences of opinion on family delimitation exist, as well. For example, Samydaceae and Scyphostegiaceae may be recognized as families or included in a large version of Salicaceae.

The group is difficult to characterize phenotypically, due to sheer morphological diversity, ranging from tropical holoparasites with giant flowers and temperate trees and herbs with tiny, simple flowers. Members often have dentate leaves, with the teeth having  a single vein running into a congested and often deciduous apex (i.e., violoid, salicoid, or theoid). Also, zeylanol  has recently been discovered in Balanops and Dichapetalum  which are in the balanops clade (so-called Chrysobalanaceae s. l.). The so-called parietal suborder (the clusioid clade and Ochnaceae s. l. were also part of Parietales) corresponds with the traditional Violales as 8 (Achariaceae, Violaceae, Flacourtiaceae, Lacistemataceae, Scyphostegiaceae, Turneraceae, Malesherbiaceae, and Passifloraceae) of the order's 10 families along with Salicaceae, which have usually been assigned as a related order or suborder, are in this most derived malpighian suborder, so that eight of the 10 families of this suborder are Violales. The family Flacourtiaceae has proven to be polyphyletic as the cyanogenic members have been placed in Achariaceae and the ones with salicoid teeth were transferred to Salicaceae. Scyphostegiaceae, consisting of the single genus Scyphostegia has been merged into Salicaceae.

Phylogeny

2009

The phylogeny of Malpighiales is, at its deepest level, an unresolved polytomy of 16 clades. It has been estimated that complete resolution of the phylogeny will require at least 25000 base pairs of DNA sequence data per taxon. A similar situation exists with Lamiales and it has been analyzed in some detail. The phylogenetic tree shown below is from Wurdack and Davis (2009). The statistical support for each branch is 100% bootstrap percentage and 100% posterior probability, except where labeled, with bootstrap percentage followed by posterior probability.

2012
In 2012, Xi et al. managed to obtain a more resolved phylogenetic tree than previous studies through the use of data from a large number of genes. They included analyses of 82 plastid genes from 58 species (they ignored the problematic Rafflesiaceae), using partitions identified a posteriori by applying a Bayesian mixture model. Xi et al. identified 12 additional clades and three major, basal clades.

Changes made in the Angiosperm Phylogeny Group (APG) classification of 2016 (APG IV) were the inclusion of Irvingiaceae, Peraceae, Euphorbiaceae and Ixonanthaceae, together with the transfer of the COM clade from the fabids (rosid I) to the malvids (rosid II).

References

Bibliography 

 
 
 
 
 
  (see also Angiosperm Phylogeny Website)

External links 

 
Angiosperm orders
Extant Aptian first appearances